Hutchings is a surname of English and Scottish origin. People with the surname include:

Alex Hutchings (ice hockey) (born 1990), Canadian ice hockey player
Arthur Hutchings (1906–1989), English musicologist
Ashley Hutchings (born 1945), English folk musician
Carl Hutchings (born 1974), English footballer
Chris Hutchings (born 1957), English footballer
Cory Hutchings (born 1972), New Zealand surf lifesaver
E. T. Hutchings (1886–1958), American architect
Frederick Hutchings (1880–1934), English cricketer
Geoffrey Hutchings (1939–2010), English actor
Graham Hutchings, British chemist
Gudie Hutchings (born 1959), Canadian politician
Ian Hutchings (born 1968), Zimbabwean golfer
Jack Hutchings (1882–1966), New Zealand cricketer
James Mason Hutchings (1820–1902), American businessman
Jamie Hutchings (born 1971), Australian rock musician
Jeffrey A. Hutchings (1958–2022), Canadian scientist
John Hutchings, a British sailor killed in the Icarus affair
Johnny Hutchings (1916–1963), American baseball pitcher
Keith Hutchings, Canadian politician
Kenneth Hutchings (1882–1916), English cricketer
Kimberly Hutchings, British academic
Mark Hutchings (born 1991), Australian rules footballer
Michael Hutchings (chef) (born 1949), American chef
Michael Hutchings (mathematician), American mathematician
Noah Hutchings (1922–2015), American religious broadcaster
Richard Hutchings (born 1978), English cricketer
Robert Hutchings, American academic
Sarah Hutchings (born 1984), American composer
Steve Hutchings (born 1990), English footballer
Stuart James Hutchings (born 1951), Welsh chess master
Tim Hutchings (born 1958), English runner
Timothy Hutchings (born 1974), American artist
William Hutchings (1879–1948), English cricketer
William S. Hutchings (1832–1911), American mathematics prodigy 

English-language surnames